State Correctional Institution – Huntingdon is a close-security correctional facility, located near Huntingdon, Pennsylvania, in the Allegheny Mountains. SCI Huntingdon was, until the reopening of SCI-Pittsburgh, the oldest-operating state correctional facility in the Commonwealth of Pennsylvania.

History
The facility was opened in 1889 and was modeled after the Elmira Reformatory in New York and was called the Huntingdon Reformatory for Young Offenders. SCI Huntingdon was used for "defective delinquents" until 1960, after that it became a maximum-security prison, housing Capital Case inmates until 1995. SCI Huntingdon is now a close-security institution.

Notable inmates
George Feigley, sex cult leader, served part of his sentence at SCI- Huntingdon, from 1983 to 1998.
 Kermit Gosnell, abortion provider and convicted child murderer
 Joseph Kallinger, who had initially been held at the state prison at Huntingdon until he attacked another inmate with a razor-studded belt.
 William Dean Christensen, serial killer known as "America's Jack the Ripper".
 Norman Johnston Escaped from SCI-Huntingdon August 2, 1999 and was captured 3 weeks later. He was convicted for the 1978 murders of 4 four teenagers to cover up a family burglary ring which were portrayed in the film "At Close Range" starring Sean Penn. 
 Cosmo Dinardo, 20-year-old serial killer that murdered 4 young men on his family's 90 acre Solebury Township farm in 2017

See also
 List of Pennsylvania state prisons
 State Correctional Institution - Smithfield

References

External links
 PA Department of Corrections - SCI Huntingdon

Prisons in Pennsylvania
Buildings and structures in Huntingdon County, Pennsylvania
1889  establishments in Pennsylvania